Valentin Igorevich Moldavsky (born 6 February 1992) is a Russian mixed martial artist and combat sambo practitioner. He is currently signed to Bellator MMA, where he is a former interim Bellator Heavyweight Champion. He is also a two-time world and one-time European Sambo Champion in the +100 kg division. As of March 14, 2023, he is #2 in the Bellator Heavyweight Rankings.

Biography
Moldavsky was born 6 February 1992 in the village of Novopskov in the Luhansk Oblast. He was enrolled at the Luhansk State University of Internal Affairs, working as platoon leader.

Sambo
In 2018, Moldavsky won the European Sambo Championships in Athens, Greece and the World Sambo Championships in Bucharest, Romania in the +100 kg weight category.

He also won the 2020 Russian national Championship, which allowed him to qualify for the 2020 World Sambo Championships in Serbia. He claimed the World Championship in the +100 kg category.

Mixed martial arts career

Early career
After going undefeated in amateur bouts, Moldavsky had his first professional fight was with Armenian Karen Karapetyan in Omsk on 21 February 2015, beating him with an armlock. Soon after, Moldavsky has been coached by Fedor Emelianenko and joined his Team Fedor.

Rizin Fighting Federation
In 2016, Moldavsky entered the Rizin Openweight Grand-Prix. In the first round in September 2016, he defeated Karl Albrektsson by unanimous decision to advance. In the quarter-finals on 29 December 2016, he defeated Szymon Bajor by unanimous decision. Two days later, he suffered his first loss to Iranian Amir Aliakbari by decision.

Bellator MMA
Moldavsky debuted for Bellator MMA at Bellator 181 on 14 July 2017, beating Carl Seumanutafa by unanimous decision.

Moldavsky returned to the promotion on 13 July 2018, knocking out Ernest James in the first round at Bellator 202.

Moldavsky faced Linton Vassell on March 22, 2019 at Bellator 218, winning the bout by unanimous decision.

Moldavsky faced Javy Ayala at Bellator 239 on February 21, 2020. Using takedowns and dominating Ayala on the ground, Moldavsky won the fight by unanimous decision.

In his highest profile fight to date, Moldavsky faced Roy Nelson at Bellator 244 on August 21, 2020. He won the fight by unanimous decision.

With heavyweight champion Ryan Bader moving on in the Bellator Light Heavyweight World Grand Prix Tournament, Moldavsky faced Timothy Johnson for the Bellator Interim Heavyweight World Championship at Bellator 261 on June 25, 2021. He won the bout and the title by unanimous decision.

Moldavsky faced Bellator Heavyweight World Champion Ryan Bader to unify the Heavyweight titles on January 29, 2022 at Bellator 273. He lost the bout via unanimous decision. 7 out of 11 media scores gave it to Moldavsky.

Moldavsky faced Steve Mowry at Bellator 284 on August 12, 2022. Less than a minute into the bout, Moldavsky accidentally eye poked Mowry, rendering him unable to continue, resulting in a no contest.

Moldavsky rematched Linton Vassell on March 10, 2023 at Bellator 292. He lost the bout in the first round, getting dropped on the feet and knocked out by elbows from mount.

Championships and accomplishments 
Bellator MMA
Interim Bellator Heavyweight World Championship (One time)
Rizin Fighting Federation
2016 Rizin Openweight Grand Prix Semifinalist

Mixed martial arts record

|-
| Loss
|align=center| 11–3 (1)
|Linton Vassell
|KO (punches and elbows)
|Bellator 292
|
|align=center|1
|align=center|3:03
|San Jose, California, United States
|
|-
|NC
|align=center|
|Steve Mowry
|No Contest (accidental eye poke)
|Bellator 284
|
|align=center|1
|align=center|0:54
|Sioux Falls, South Dakota, United States
|
|-
|Loss
|align=center|11–2
|Ryan Bader
|Decision (unanimous)
|Bellator 273
|
|align=center|5
|align=center|5:00
|Phoenix, Arizona, United States
|
|-
|Win
|align=center|11–1
|Timothy Johnson
|Decision (unanimous)
|Bellator 261 
|
|align=center|5
|align=center|5:00
|Uncasville, Connecticut, United States 
|
|-
|Win
|align=center|10–1
|Roy Nelson
|Decision (unanimous)
|Bellator 244 
|
|align=center|3
|align=center|5:00
|Uncasville, Connecticut, United States 
|
|-
|Win
|align=center| 9–1
|Javy Ayala
|Decision (unanimous) 
|Bellator 239
|
|align=center|3
|align=center|5:00
|Thackerville, Oklahoma, United States
|
|-
| Win
| align=center| 8–1
| Linton Vassell
| Decision (unanimous)
| Bellator 218
| 
| align=center| 3
| align=center| 5:00
| Thackerville, Oklahoma, United States
| 
|-
| Win
| align=center| 7–1
| Ernest James
| TKO (punches)
| Bellator 202
| 
| align=center| 2
| align=center| 4:02
| Thackerville, Oklahoma, United States
| 
|-
| Win
| align=center| 6–1
| Carl Seumanutafa
| Decision (unanimous)
| Bellator 181
| 
| align=center| 3
| align=center| 5:00
| Thackerville, Oklahoma, United States
| 
|-
| Loss
| align=center| 5–1
| Amir Aliakbari
| Decision (split)
| Rizin World Grand Prix 2016: Final Round
| 
| align=center| 2
| align=center| 5:00
| Saitama, Japan
| 
|-
| Win
| align=center| 5–0
| Szymon Bajor
| Decision (unanimous)
| Rizin World Grand Prix 2016: 2nd Round
| 
| align=center| 2
| align=center| 5:00
| Saitama, Japan
|  
|-
| Win
| align=center| 4–0
| Karl Albrektsson
| Decision (unanimous)
| Rizin World Grand Prix 2016: 1st Round
| 
| align=center| 2
| align=center| 5:00
| Saitama, Japan
|  
|-
| Win
| align=center| 3–0 
| Daniel Doerrer
| Submission (guillotine choke)
| Fight Nights Global 50: Fedor vs. Maldonado
| 
| align=center| 1
| align=center| 0:47
| St. Petersburg, Russia
|
|-
| Win
| align=center| 2–0
| Yuta Uchida
| Submission (rear-naked choke)
| Rizin World Grand Prix 2015: Part 1 - Saraba
| 
| align=center| 1
| align=center| 2:20
| Saitama, Japan
| 
|-
| Win
| align=center| 1–0
| Karen Karapetyan
| Submission (armbar)
| Professional Combat Sambo: Eurasian Economic Union
| 
| align=center| 1
| align=center| 1:26
| Omsk, Russia
|

See also
 List of current Bellator fighters
 List of male mixed martial artists

References

External links
 

1992 births
Living people
Russian sambo practitioners
Russian male mixed martial artists
Ukrainian sambo practitioners
Ukrainian male mixed martial artists
Ukrainian emigrants to Russia
Naturalised citizens of Russia
Mixed martial artists utilizing sambo
Sportspeople from Luhansk Oblast